Vettu Onnu Thundu Rendu is a 1998 Tamil-language film directed by Sakthi Chidambaram(credited as C.Dinakaran). The film stars Mansoor Ali Khan, Ponnambalam and Keerthana. The film, which had music composed by A. K. Vasagan, opened in May 1998.

Cast
Mansoor Ali Khan
Ponnambalam
Keerthana

Production
Production took place throughout 1997, with the lead actor Mansoor Ali Khan prioritising the film as he was the main lead. The actor suffered an injury in a road accident during the making of the film.

Soundtrack
The film's soundtrack, composed by A. K. Vasagan, was released in 1997. Singers including P. Unnikrishnan, Mano and Shahul Hameed sang songs for the album.
"Pudhuvaanam" – P. Unnikrishnan, Sujatha
"Pacharisi" – Vasagan, Febi Mani
"Vettu Onnu" – Mano
"Ponnamma" – Unnikrishnan
"Silu Silukkum" – Yugendran, Indhu
"Moonu Mukalana" – Mano

Release
In late 1998, Mansoor Ali Khan was arrested for causing a roadblock and obstructing traffic while protesting against pirated re-runs of the film Vettu Onnu Thundu Rendu on cable television. His activity led to film distributor Chinthamani Murugesan releasing a press statement condemning the television's actions and prompted a shut down of cinema halls across Pondicherry for one day. He later filed a police complaint about the matter at Orleanpet police station and in 2001, the court sentenced two involved men to two years' imprisonment each and ordering them to pay a fine of Rs.5 lakh for illegal streaming. In 2007, the court sentenced the two persons to six months' imprisonment each and ordered them to pay a fine of Rs. 3 lakh in a case of copyright infringement.

References

1998 films
1990s Tamil-language films
Films directed by Sakthi Chidambaram